Ducky-Ducky-Ducky  is a 2020  Russian short  film  directed by Sergei Solovyov. Movie party of the competition program of the 49th Rotterdam Film Festival.

Cast
  as Nicole
Anastasia Teplinskaya as Mila
 Sergei Solovyov as old fisherman

References

External links
 Старики и панки. Лучшие фильмы Роттердамского кинофестиваля
 Странное время заставляет думать о странном – например, о фильмах, названия которых выходят из ряда вон
 На Роттердамский кинфестиваль пригласили российских некромантов

2020 films
Russian short films
Films directed by Sergei Solovyov

Films about mermaids